3420 or variant, may refer to:

In general
 A.D. 3420, a year in the 4th millennium CE
 3420 BC, a year in the 4th millennium BCE
 3420, a number in the 3000 (number) range

Other uses
 3420 Standish, an asteroid in the Asteroid Belt, the 3420th asteroid registered
 IBM 3420, a 9-track tape cartridge drive unit
 Hawaii Route 3420, a state highway
 Texas Farm to Market Road 3420, a state highway

See also